Eoin Ryan (born 24 February 1953) is a former Irish Fianna Fáil politician. He was a Member of the European Parliament (MEP) for Dublin from 2004 to 2009, and also was a Teachta Dála (TD) for Dublin South-East from 1992 to 2007.

Ryan was born in Dublin in 1953 and educated at St. Mary's College, Rathmines; College of Commerce, Rathmines; and Kildalton Horticulture College, County Kilkenny. In 1985 he was elected to Dublin City Council. In 1989 he was nominated to Seanad Éireann by then Taoiseach Charles Haughey. Ryan was elected to Dáil Éireann for the first time at the 1992 general election. He was re-elected at the 1997 general election, topping the poll in the Dublin South-East constituency.

In February 2000 Ryan was appointed Minister of State at the Department of Tourism, Sport and Recreation. He was not re-appointed in 2002. In 2004 he was elected to the European Parliament for the Dublin constituency, sitting in the Union for Europe of the Nations group.

Ryan comes from an Irish political family. His father, Eoin Ryan Snr, was a senator in Seanad Éireann for a number of years. Ryan's grandfather was James Ryan, a founding-member of Fianna Fáil and a long-serving cabinet minister.

Ryan retired from national politics at the 2007 general election, opting to concentrate on European politics. He lost his seat at the 2009 European Parliament election.

References

External links

1953 births
Living people
Fianna Fáil MEPs
Fianna Fáil TDs
Local councillors in Dublin (city)
Members of the 19th Seanad
Members of the 27th Dáil
Members of the 28th Dáil
Members of the 29th Dáil
MEPs for the Republic of Ireland 2004–2009
Ministers of State of the 28th Dáil
Nominated members of Seanad Éireann
Fianna Fáil senators
People educated at St Mary's College, Dublin